Bandhavyalu  is a 1968 Telugu film produced and directed by S. V. Ranga Rao. The film is a remake of the Tamil movie Kan Kanda Deivam and also launched the Telugu foray for the South female superstar, Lakshmi.

Plot
Ranga Rao is the landlord in a village. He lives with his brother Dhulipala. Savithri, wife of Dhulipala, takes care of the daily chores very well. They have three sons, who study in town.

It is the story of the relations and bonding between family members. Ranga Rao's family and Rajnal's family are neighbors. Ranga Rao has a brother. His brother and his wife are very kind at heart and their family is a very organized family, but Rajnal's brother Suryam (Chandra Mohan) is very angry with his brother and doesn't support him in anything. The film shows differences in bonding between a healthy related family and a weakly related family.

Cast
 S. V. Ranga Rao
 Dhulipala ... Brother of the main character
 V. Nagayya ... Acharyulu
 Chandra Mohan
 Lakshmi (debut) ... Lakshmi
 Savitri ... Sister-in-Law of main character
 Rajanala Kaleswara Rao
 Haranath
 Allu Ramalingaiah

Crew
 Director: S. V. Ranga Rao
 Producers: Badeti Satyanarayana, Putta Venkat Rao and S. V. Ranga Rao
 Production Company: S.V.R. Films
 Dialogues: D. V. Narasa Raju
 Lyricist: C. Narayana Reddy, Kosaraju Raghavaiah
 Music Director: Saluri Hanumantha Rao
 Playback singers: Ghantasala and P. Susheela

Songs
The lyrics were written by C. Narayanaya Reddy and Kosaraju Raghavaiah. The music score was composed by Saluri Hanumanta Rao. The playback singers were Ghantasala Venkateswara Rao, B. Vasanta and P. Susheela.
 "Atu Gantala Motalu Gana Gana" (Singers: Ghantasala and B. Vasantha; Cast: Chandramohan and Lakshmi)
 "Avvai Suvai" (Singers: Ghantasala and P. Susheela; Cast: Chandramohan and Lakshmi)
 "Maa Raitu Baabayya"
 "Manchitanaaniki" (Singer: Ghantasala)
 "Tuvvayi Tuvvayi"

Awards
 Badeti Satyanarayana & Putta Venkata rao  won the Nandi Award for Best Feature Film - Gold in 1968.

References

External links
 

1968 films
1960s Telugu-language films
Indian black-and-white films
Films scored by S. Hanumantha Rao
Telugu remakes of Tamil films